This is a list of monuments that are classified by the Moroccan ministry of culture around El Hajeb.

Monuments and sites in El Hajeb 

|}

References 

El Hajeb
El Hajeb Province